The list of ship launches in 1925 includes a chronological list of some ships launched in 1925.

References

Sources

1925
Ship launches